FK Gemidžii is a football club based in the city of Veles, North Macedonia. They was recently played in the Macedonian Third League.

History
The club was founded in 2008, and was named  after the anarchistic group who have committed the bombings in Thessaloniki on 1903.

References

External links
Club info at MacedonianFootball 
Football Federation of Macedonia 

Gemidžii
Association football clubs established in 2008
2008 establishments in the Republic of Macedonia